= Commissioner DJ Wysei =

Nigerian disc jockey

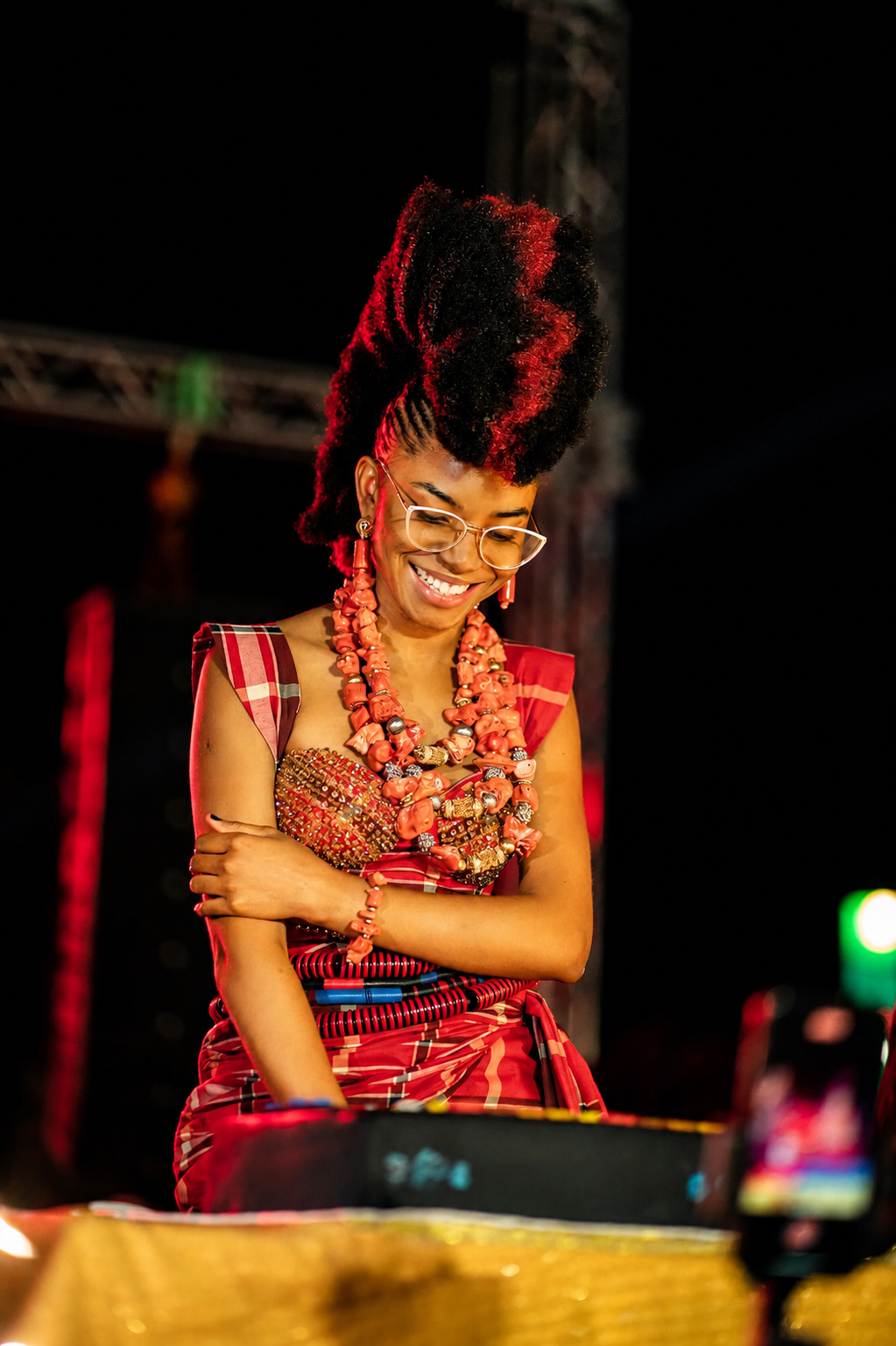
- Commissioner DJ Wysei at Commissioner's Festival 2.0 in 2024

Background information
- Origin: Mbaise, Imo State, Nigeria
- Occupation: Disc jockey
- Years active: 2014–present

Ebere Patricia Iwuagwu, professionally known as Commissioner DJ Wysei, is a Nigerian disc jockey, entertainer and songwriter. She is known for incorporating live electronic drumming into her DJ performances. She has worked as a disc jockey for Wazobia FM 95.1 Lagos, served as an official DJ on The Nancy Isime Show, and appeared as a guest DJ on editions of Big Brother Naija and Big Brother Titans. Her career has included touring and performances outside Nigeria, including appearances in the United States, United Kingdom and South Africa.

Iwuagwu has also developed her own live-event brand, the Commissioner's Festival, first staged in 2023, and has performed at large-format events including the Meisters Expression Festival and Monkey Shoulder PressPlay concerts. Her recording collaborations include work with Jamaican reggae singer Richie Stephens and Nigerian artists Kaptain and Salle. In 2026, she was nominated for Best DJ Africa at the African Muzik Magazine Awards (AFRIMMA).

== Early life and education ==
Iwuagwu is from Mbaise in Imo State, Nigeria. In a 2025 interview with Punch, she said that she was the youngest of eight children and was raised primarily by her mother, who worked as a nurse and midwife.

She attended St Theresa Missionary School in Obowu, Imo State, and later studied Information Technology at the National Open University of Nigeria.

Iwuagwu has said that she initially had an interest in football before pursuing a career in entertainment. In the same 2025 interview, she described an accident in 2014 as a turning point that ended her pursuit of football and contributed to her decision to enter entertainment. A 2026 profile in THISDAY also reported her account of the accident and subsequent transition into music and disc jockeying.

By 2025, Iwuagwu said that she was pursuing a master's degree in Barcelona, Spain. Earlier reports had similarly stated that she was undertaking postgraduate study in Spain.

== Stage name ==
Iwuagwu has said that the nickname "Wysei" originated during her secondary-school years, when a Reverend Father who was her school principal gave her the nickname because he considered her unusually wise for her age.

She later adopted the name "DJ Wysei" as she developed an interest in disc jockeying. According to Iwuagwu, she subsequently added "Commissioner" after a friend remarked that she was dressed like a commissioner.

== Career ==
=== Early career and radio ===
Sources differ on the exact year in which Iwuagwu began working as a DJ, with reports placing the beginning of her career between 2014 and 2015. She became an in-house DJ at the radio station of the National Open University of Nigeria in 2016.

Iwuagwu has credited Nigerian disc jockey DJ Switch with helping her develop her professional DJ skills. In her 2025 Punch interview, she said she met DJ Switch while accompanying other DJs to performances and subsequently received training from her. THISDAY later reported the same account in a profile of Iwuagwu's career.

On 31 December 2018, Iwuagwu was announced as a DJ for Globe Broadcasting and Communication, the parent company of Wazobia FM 95.1 Lagos. BusinessDay also reported her association with Wazobia FM in a profile.

=== International media coverage ===
A number of Nigerian publications have reported that Iwuagwu received international media exposure through CNN and the BBC.

In a 2025 interview with Punch, Iwuagwu said that while she was still learning under DJ Switch she was selected for a CNN feature involving female DJs in Africa. She also said that a subsequent BBC feature and the CNN appearance were turning points in her career.

Nigerian publications have additionally reported that she appeared on BBC Igbo.

=== Performance style ===
Iwuagwu is known for incorporating live drumming into her DJ sets. The Nation reported in 2019 that drumming had become a distinguishing feature of her performances. BusinessDay similarly described live drumming as part of the performance style she had developed.

The Guardian Nigeria reported in 2020 that she combined DJing with drumming and other aspects of live performance. A 2026 THISDAY profile described her use of live electronic drums as a signature element of her performances.

=== Television appearances ===
In 2020, Iwuagwu appeared on Africa Magic's Pepsi-sponsored Turn Up Friday alongside media personality Dotun "The Energy Gad".

In 2022, she served as the official DJ on The Nancy Isime Show. Independent Nigeria also reported her role as the programme's official DJ for the 2022 season.

Iwuagwu has also made recurring appearances as a guest DJ on the Big Brother franchise. On 28 August 2021, she performed at the Week 5 Saturday Night Party during the sixth season of Big Brother Naija, Shine Ya Eye. Africa Magic's official coverage identified Commissioner DJ Wysei as the DJ for the party.

She returned to Big Brother Naija during the seventh season, Level Up, performing alongside DJ DSF at the Week 8 Saturday Night Party on 17 September 2022.

On 18 March 2023, Iwuagwu performed at a Saturday Night Party during the inaugural season of Big Brother Titans. Coverage of the season identified her as the Week 9 DJ.

Later in 2023, she appeared as a special guest DJ during the eighth season of Big Brother Naija, All Stars. Africa Magic reported that she performed on both the DJ decks and drums during the Saturday Night Rave.

=== Festivals and concerts ===
In 2020, Iwuagwu performed as part of Soundcity Africa's virtual Amazon in the Mix concert.

Her festival appearances have included several editions of Jägermeister's Meisters Expression Festival. In August 2022, BellaNaija listed her among the performers at the Lagos edition at the Balmoral Convention Centre, alongside artists including Fireboy DML, Blaqbonez and Fave and DJs including DJ Obi and DJ Baggio.

In April 2023, she performed at the Meisters Expression Festival at Michael Okpara Square in Enugu. The Guardian Nigeria reported that her DJ set formed part of a programme that also included Nigerian and international performance acts.

She also appeared at the Lagos Island edition of the festival at Good Beach in June 2023. The Guardian Nigeria reported a lineup including Seyi Vibez, Fireboy DML, Boy Spyce, Magixx, Whitemoney and Small Doctor, with Iwuagwu among the DJs. She was also billed as one of the DJs for a Meisters Expression concert at Trans Amusement Park in Ibadan.

Iwuagwu has also appeared at Monkey Shoulder PressPlay concerts. The Guardian Nigeria identified her among the DJs at the 2022 edition, alongside DJ Obi, DJ TTB and DJ Gigi Jasmine. She later performed at the Port Harcourt edition in 2024.

=== Commissioner's Festival ===
Iwuagwu launched her own recurring live event, Commissioner's Festival, in 2023. In a 2025 interview with Punch, she described hosting the inaugural edition as one of the defining moments of her career and said that more than 7,000 people attended. Promotional material for the inaugural event placed it at the Digital Library Field of Nnamdi Azikiwe University in Awka, Anambra State, on 27 October 2023.

The second edition, Commissioner's Festival 2.0, was held at Hero Square in Owerri, Imo State, in 2024. Daily Trust reported that the event attracted a large crowd and featured multiple entertainers.

In December 2025, Iwuagwu staged a separate first homecoming concert in Mbaise, Imo State, at Ahiara Junction. THISDAY later reported on the homecoming as part of a profile of her career.

=== International performances and touring ===
Iwuagwu's career has included performances outside Nigeria. In July and August 2022, she undertook a tour of the United States. Vanguard and New Telegraph reported that the tour was organised by Bone Entertainment and Event in conjunction with B2 Sports Bar and Lounge.

Her March 2023 appearance on Big Brother Titans provided a documented performance in South Africa.

In the United Kingdom, Iwuagwu was billed for a live performance at Club94 Manchester on 25 August 2024. She returned to Manchester on 6 March 2026 for the She's the Vibe event at Xscape Manchester.

=== Later career and recognition ===
In 2024, the Imo State Government honoured Iwuagwu at a ceremony in Owerri for her contributions to the state's cultural and economic profile. Vanguard reported that Governor Hope Uzodimma was represented at the event by the state's Commissioner for Youth Development and Talent Hunt.

In April 2026, The Nation and The Guardian Nigeria reported that Iwuagwu's TikTok account had reached five million followers.

== Music ==
In addition to DJ mixes and live performances, Iwuagwu has released original music and collaborations.

In 2022, she collaborated with Jamaican reggae singer Richie Stephens on a remix of his song Valley.

In September 2023, she released Body, a collaboration with Nigerian artist Kaptain. Music metadata credits Ebere Patricia Iwuagwu and Etuk Favour Monday as songwriters.

In November 2023, she released Ojuju with singer Salle. The recording credits Ebere Pat Iwuagwu and Kosisochukwu Gospel Peters as songwriters.

Her subsequent releases have included Commi Nwa, Gyration Drums and Money Good. Money Good, released in November 2025, credits Iwuagwu as a songwriter.

In January 2026, Iwuagwu appeared as a featured artist on King Duke Melody's Egwu Oma, alongside Favour Glitterz and MILAS REVEAL.

On 26 April 2026, she released Onulu Ube Drum Version. Shazam credits Iwuagwu with drums and songwriting.

=== Selected singles ===
Year	Title	Other artist(s)
2022	Valley (Remix)	Richie Stephens
2022	Happiness	Hypeman Luckey
2023	Body	Kaptain
2023	Ojuju	Salle
2023	Sipe Nwa	Obisco Nwamama
2024	Commi Nwa	—
2024	Mercy Chinwo Drum Mix	—
2025	Gyration Drums	—
2025	Money Good	—
2026	Onulu Ube Drum Version	—

== Awards and recognition ==
Nigerian publications including The Nation, BusinessDay, The Guardian Nigeria and The Sun have reported that Iwuagwu won the Best Female DJ in Nigeria category at the Gbedu Awards in 2016 and the Best Female DJ, Eastern Nigeria category at the Biggy's Awards for Entertainment in 2017.

Year	Award	Category	Result
2016	Gbedu Awards	Best Female DJ in Nigeria	Won
2017	Biggy's Awards for Entertainment	Best Female DJ, Eastern Nigeria	Won
2022	The Beatz Awards	Female DJ of the Year	Nominated
2023	The Beatz Awards	DJ Female of the Year	Nominated
2023	Scream All Youth Awards	DJ of the Year	Nominated
2026	African Muzik Magazine Awards (AFRIMMA)	Best DJ Africa	Nominated
